Berkshire Lowland Search and Rescue (BLSAR) is a registered charitable lowland search and rescue team based in Berkshire, United Kingdom and provides support functions (primarily search and rescue) to Thames Valley Police and the emergency planning departments of various local authorities in Berkshire. In common with most UK SAR teams, BLSAR members are all volunteers.

BLSAR was formally called SEBEV, the original meaning of SEBEV was South East Berkshire Emergency Volunteers, however the full title was dropped in 1994 and the team was then known simply as SEBEV Search and Rescue (or sometimes by the media as Berkshire Search and Rescue) in order to better reflect their role. In 2011 SEBEV changed its name again to Berkshire Lowland Search and Rescue (BLSAR).

History
The organisation was originally set up in 1980 by John Cowling as a Civil Defence volunteer team to provide support for the local authorities and the statutory emergency services during civil emergencies as a category one responder, support organisation (CCA 2004). At the time its membership consisted of mainly council employees who met once a month for basic training in such things as message handling, logging and plotting and map reading.

In 1981, BLSAR acquired its own headquarters, an ex-street cleansing depot, in one of the local housing estates which was redesigned and redecorated as a training area with communications facilities. Gradually the council staff left and replacement volunteers came from friends. Over a period of time they became entirely composed of non local authority staff, with the exception of the borough's Emergency Planning Liaison Officer. In 1984 the team moved from their single room premises into Easthampstead Park in Wokingham, taking over the basement area already used by the government as a bomb shelter BLSAR moved out of the premises in 2018 and are now based at the old Arborfield Garrison site.

BLSAR members meet once a week to undertake training as well as training weekends, at home and away.

In 1995, its primary function changed to providing lowland search and rescue support for Berkshire.  The team, based at Easthampstead Park Conference Centre in Wokingham, Berkshire is available 24 hours a day to search for missing persons. BLSAR also assists other SAR teams in neighbouring counties, when needed. The team has its own fully equipped incident control vehicle and an incident support vehicle plus all equipment necessary for rescue and first aid purposes.

BLSAR meets weekly for training in such subjects as search techniques. communications, navigation, first aid, including use of Automatic External Defibrillators, rescue techniques, team building, navigation amongst other subjects.

BLSAR is a member team of ALSAR the Association of Lowland Search and Rescue and is mentioned in the Search and Rescue Framework for the United Kingdom of Great Britain and Northern Ireland.

Fundraising and Events 
Berkshire Lowland Search and Rescue (BLSAR) is funded purely by its own fundraising efforts, local community events and occasional grants or donations.

BLSAR provides first aid, marshals and stewards for local events such as carnivals, music festivals, sports activities and firework displays.

References

External links

Association of Lowland Search and Rescue

Volunteer search and rescue in the United Kingdom
Organizations established in 1980
Organisations based in Berkshire